Shavei Darom (lit. Returnees to the South) is a village in southern Israel. Located to the south-east of Sderot, it falls under the jurisdiction of Merhavim Regional Council.

History
The village was built to rehouse former residents of Kfar Darom, an Israeli settlement in the Gaza Strip that was evacuated as part of the Gaza disengagement in 2005. Its construction was approved by the government in December 2009, with the former settlers having lived in Ashkelon following their removal from Gaza. The new residents arrived in 2010, initially living in caravans.

References

External links
Official website

Populated places established in 2010
2010 establishments in Israel
Populated places in Southern District (Israel)